The 2011–12 season is Sporting CP's 79th season in the top flight, the Primeira Liga, known as the Liga ZON Sagres for sponsorship purposes. This article shows player statistics and all matches (official and friendly) that the club plays during the 2011–12 season.

Sporting CP's under-19 squad played in the inaugural tournament of the NextGen series.

Season overview

Pre-season

Players

Squad information

Transfers

In

Total spending:  €15.275 million

Out

 
Total income:  €0 million

Club

Coaching staff

Kit

|
|
|
|
|
|
|
|

Competitions

Pre-season

Last updated: 28 July 2011
Source: Sporting.pt, footballzz.co.uk

Primeira Liga

League table

Matches

Source: Sporting.pt, Journal Record

Taça da Liga

Third round

Source: Sporting.pt,

UEFA Europa League

Play-off round

Group stage

Knockout phase

Round of 32

Round of 16

Quarter-finals

Semi-finals

Taça de Portugal

Round of 64

Round of 32

Round of 16

Quarter-finals

Semi-finals

|}

Final

Overview

References

External links 
 Official club website 

2011-12
Portuguese football clubs 2011–12 season
Sporting